Peter Docherty (born 14 February 1929, died 1957) was an English footballer who played as an outside forward in the Football League for Darlington.

Docherty signed for First Division club Fulham in September 1949, but he never represented them in the league, and returned to his native north-east of England and signed for Darlington a year later. Standing in for regular outside left Gordon Galley, Docherty scored on his senior debut, on 7 October 1950 in a 1–1 draw at home to Tranmere Rovers in the Third Division North. He kept his place for the next match, and made his third and final appearance in February 1951.
He died in 1957.

References

1929 births
1957 deaths
People from Hebburn
Footballers from Tyne and Wear
English footballers
Association football outside forwards
Fulham F.C. players
Darlington F.C. players
English Football League players